Kalachevsky/Kalachyovsky (masculine), Kalachevskaya/Kalachyovskaya (feminine), or Kalachevskoye/Kalachyovskoye (neuter) may refer to:

 Kalachyovsky District, a district of Volgograd Oblast, Russia
 Kalachevskoye Urban Settlement, incorporating Kalach-na-Donu, Kalachyovsky District, Volgograd Oblast, Russia
 Kalachevsky (rural locality), Volgograd Oblast, Russia

See also
 Kalacheyevsky (disambiguation)
 Kalach (disambiguation)